In the 1960s, for a second decade, the United States FBI continued to maintain a public list of the people it regarded as the Ten Most Wanted Fugitives. Following is a brief review of FBI people and events that place the 1960s decade in context, and then an historical list of individual suspects whose names first appeared on the 10 Most Wanted list during the decade of the 1960s, under FBI Director J. Edgar Hoover.

FBI headlines in the 1960s
As a decade, the 1960s were the final and most controversial of the Hoover era in the Bureau. The famous Director had formed and defined the Bureau for nearly a half century.  During the turbulent 1960s, the FBI continued controversial domestic surveillance in an operation called Cointelpro. It aimed at investigating and disrupting dissident political organizations within the United States, including civil rights leaders, such as Martin Luther King Jr. who was a frequent target of investigation.

As a more friendly face presented to the public, in 1965 Warner Bros. Television presented the series The F.B.I., showing dramatizations taken from actual historical FBI cases, starring Efrem Zimbalist, Jr. as fictional agent Louis Erskine. Epilogues included Zimbalist stepping out of character to alert viewers to Ten Most Wanted Fugitives from the FBI's contemporary list.

FBI "Most Wanted Fugitives" in the 1960s
The FBI in the past has identified individuals by the sequence number in which each individual has appeared on the list.  Some individuals have even appeared twice, and often a sequence number was permanently assigned to an individual suspect who was soon caught, captured, or simply removed, before his or her appearance could be published on the publicly released list.  In those cases, the public would see only gaps in the number sequence reported by the FBI.  For convenient reference, the wanted suspect's sequence number and date of entry on the FBI list appear below, whenever possible.

As the new decade opened, six of the ten places on the list remained filled by these elusive long-time fugitives, then still at large:

 1950 #14 (ten years), Frederick J. Tenuto 
 1952 #36 (eight years), James Eddie Diggs
 1954 #78 (six years), David Daniel Keegan 
 1956 #97 (four years), Eugene Francis Newman 
 1958 #107 (two years), Angelo Luigi Pero 
 1959 #112 (one year), Edwin Sanford Garrison

The most wanted fugitives listed in the decade of the 1960s includes (in FBI list appearance sequence  order):

Year 1960

Joseph Corbett, Jr.
Joseph Corbett, Jr. was wanted for kidnap and murder of wealthy heir Adolph Coors III
status: paroled in 1980

Year 1961

Year 1962

Year 1963

Year 1964

Year 1965

Year 1966

Year 1967

Year 1968

James Earl Ray
April 20, 1968 #277, & also June 11, 1977 #351
Two months on the list
James Earl Ray was apprehended June 8, 1968 in London, England by British authorities for the assassination of Martin Luther King Jr. He died of hepatitis C at age 70 in prison.

Year 1969

Billie Austin Bryant
January 8, 1969 #295 
shortest time (excluding never published) on the list, 2 hours
Fourth "Special Addition"
Billie Austin Bryant was wanted for first degree murder of two FBI Agents
status: US PRISONER at the Federal Penitentiary at Atlanta, Georgia November 4, 1969

By the end of the decade, the following Fugitives were the FBI's Ten Most Wanted:

 1965 #203 (five years), John William Clouser
 1968 #265 (two years), Charles Lee Herron
 1968 #279 (two years), Taylor Morris Teaford
 1968 #282 (two years), Byron James Rice
 1969 #298 (one year), Warren David Reddock
 1969 #300 (one year), Cameron David Bishop
 1969 #301 (one year), Marie Dean Arrington
 1969 #302 (six months), Benjamin Hoskin Paddock (also father of shooter in 2017 Las Vegas shooting)
 1969 #304 (three months), Joseph Lloyd Thomas

The tenth space had just opened up at the end of the year 1969.

References

External links
Current FBI top ten most wanted fugitives at FBI site

1960s in the United States